Prajapati(প্রজাপতি), a novel by Bengali author Samaresh Basu caused sensation with its publication. It was first published in 1967 (1374 Bengali Era) in the Sharodiyo Desh special (page no 174-226), a well known Bengali monthly magazine, a presentation of the Ananda Publishers. This novel is about a young boy who is used as the premises to understand not only his background but of the society at large. It was a young lawyer named Amal Mitra who first filed a charge of obscenity against the author Samaresh Basu and the publisher Shitangsukumar Dasgupta on 2 February 1968 for the novel Prajaproti. Later the Government of West Bengal supported Amal Mitra and spoke against Prajapoti. The Lower Court gave the verdict that the book was indeed obscene and had no literary value whatsoever. The High Court went on to uphold the just mentioned verdict. After a long time of almost seventeen years, Prajapoti got rid of the stigma 'banned' after a verdict given by Supreme Court of India in its favour.
Reportedly, Prajapati had been published by Ananda Publishers as a hard cover book before the charge of obscenity had been made against it. In its second edition in 1985 soon after the verdict had been overturned it made record sales. The 11th edition of Projapoti states that the first edition had printed 8800 copies but from the second through the tenth edition (from 1985–2003), the sales went up to 48,000 copies!

Plot summary

The novel opens with Sukhen, the protagonist, trying to capture a butterfly. Sukhen goes over to his lover's house early in the morning. Even as he tries to catch a butterfly, he is simultaneously taking with his lover and analysing his own life as he recollects the past. Sukhen had been brought up in a family where he had found no love or affection. His mother died leaving behind her husband and three sons- Keshob, Purnendu, Sukhendu. Both of his elder brothers are politicians and according to Sukhen mere opportunists. The brothers used people for their own benefit and cheat them without remorse. He remembers his mother as an extremely flirtatious woman. Sukhen's father is also devoid of any moral depth and realisation. He was a mean money minded man. Sukhen had grown up with in these circumstances. He became venturous and had no respect for elders and women. The neighbours especially the rich ones feared him. Mr. Chopra, manager of neighbouring industry and Mr. Mittir, the labour advisor, always flattered Sukhen out of fear. Sukhen remembers Jina, the daughter of Mr. Mittir who had been seduced by her kaku (uncle), Mr. Chatterjee, a colleague of her father. Sukhen also had seduced Jina.
Sukhen had become addicted to women and alcohol at a very early age, soon after having entered college. Subsequently, he got attracted to a girl named Shikha. Sukhen fell in love with Shikha when he was taking in a hunger strike conducted on the demand to rehabilitate a teacher of his college who had recently been fired by the college authority and to stop the rising of a multi-storeyed building close to the college gate.

Unlike Sukhen, Shikha hailed from a poor family. Her father is a drunkard and numb to the affairs of the family. Shikha's two brothers were subordinates of Sukhen's two elder brothers in the respective political parties of the latter. Her only sister, Bela was married but stayed at her father's house and flirted with several men.
However the presence of Shikha in Sukhen's life offered some respite to his careless and perplexed life. This relationship somehow helped to revive the latent sense of humanity in Sukhen. Sukhen hates hypocrisy. He hated those politicians who cheated and oppressed people for their own ulterior need and those teachers who used his students as a political weapon for personal benefits as well as the owners and governing body members of industries who squeeze the labourers; also the parents who were indifferent to their children, the lechers who abused children for sexual satisfaction. He also disliked the heinous attack of American soldiers on prostitutes. The atrocities around him agonised and traumatized him. He sometimes suffers from a subtle pain down to his shoulder and channelised his energy into anger to numb and forget the pain. He pees under his father's table, rumples his brothers' rooms, calls out to servants and so on to divert his attention. Yet, the otherwise brash Sukhen, respected Shulada, an old servant of their house. Keshob, the elder brother of Sukhen, is a powerful political leader.  The brother allegedly illegally traded in baby foods and railway spare parts. Keshob has several relations with married women and young girls who were members in his own party. Purnendu, the immediate elder brother is also a political leader and an employee in a governmental office. His political party apparently worked for the poor section of the country and fought for justice but ironically, he is the who copulates with their maid servant's daughter. Both of his brothers want him to join their party!  Sukhen refuses to join either of them and severely criticises their agendas. He ends up being the enemy of both the groups.

As we proceed through the novel, we see Suhken breaking off one wing of the butterfly and though Shikha tries to revive it, the fly eventually dies. After having chatted with Shikha for some time, he leaves for home. But instead going home, he moves around on the roads on his bike and sees Nirapodobabu (নিরাপদবাবু), a primary school master watching Ramesh (রমেশ), a worker of Purnendu's party, delivering a lecture. He wonders about the peaceful life of Nirapadababu and dreams of having a wife like Nirapadababu's. He plans of marrying Shikha and living peacefully like Nirapadababu. He also enjoys the company of the superintendent of police of the local police station, N’Kori Haldar (ন’কড়ি হালদার), and Bimol (বিমল) a devoted worker of Purnendu's party.
As he thinks of living a simple life with Shikha as his wife, he stops by to meet Mr. Chopra and get himself a job. But Chopra refuses him as he known that Suhken is a hooligan and the local mischief. Perturbed, Suhken wonders who are the simple and good boys? (সাধারন বাঙ্গালি ছেলে কারা?)

Sukhen then goes in search of Shutka(শুটকা), a friend of his. He ends up finding Shibe (শিবে), another friend of him in Doyalda's (দয়ালদা) tea stall. Suddenly he feels that strange pain close to his shoulder. To suppress that pain he has alcohol almost voraciously and goes to Shibe's house and there he meets Manjori (মঞ্জরী) and falls asleep. In the evening, he woke up and found Shutka close to him. He goes to Shikha's house again as he had promised to go there in the evening. At last, he comes back home at night and takes a bath and sleeps without having food. The next day there is a strike. He goes out in the evening and fells in midst of two processions. He gets severely injured in a bomb explosion and is admitted in a hospital. One of his arms had been blown off and he finally succumbs to the injury.

Controversies

Charge
On 2 February 1968 a young Bengali advocate Amal Mitra complained in the court of Chief Presidency Magistrate at Calcutta that Prajapati, a novel by Samaresh Basu "contains matters which are obscene and both the accused persons have sold, distributed, printed and exhibited the same which has the tendency to corrupt the morals of those in whose hands the said Sarodiya Desh may fall". Both the accused people, Samaresh Basu and Sitangshu Kumar Dasgupta, the publisher and the printer of Desh at the relevant time were said to have committed an offence punishable under Section 292 of the Indian Penal Code and under Section 292 read with Section 109 IPC (abetment).

Bankshall Court trial
The trial began at Bankshall Court, Kolkata under the sixth presidency magistrate Mr. R. L. Mukherjee. On 6 March 1968 Amal Mitra presented two witnesses Samarendra Basu and Kaloboron Ghosh both residents of Ballygunj. All the three said that Prajapati was an entirely obscene novel and showed concern that it would harm moral character of young generation. Samaresh Basu turned up on 6 July 1968 at the Bankshal Court. He was asked to pay a fine of rupees one thousand. Karunashankar Ray, barrister S. N. Voumik, advocate Jyanshankar Sengupta, advocate Samar Basu attended the case for Prajapati whereas advocate Topen Ray Choudhuri, Harendra Kishor Singh, Binaybhushan Dutt and Kamalesh Mitra attended the case against Prajapati. On 9 November, Sitangshu Kumar Dasgupta turned up at the court. Samaresh Basu presented his indictment before court on 16 November. In his piece, he refuted the charges made against Prajapati Budhyadeb Basu, a well known literary figure of Bengali literature and formerly Chairman of Comparative Literature Society of Jadavpur University, attended the Court on 16 November to give witness for Prajapati. In his speech he repeatedly emphasised that this novel has projected some characters which are essentially part of our contemporary society. He also quoted some passages from the scriptures in defence of Prajapati. He said that the scriptures also described the theme of sexuality openly. But he was argued with the lawyers of the opposition that such scriptures were protected by special law! Budhadev Basu's main argument was that sometimes in great literature the flickering of vulgarity could be seen but it did not necessarily mean obscenity. This vulgarity became subdued because of the merit of literature and art. Naresh Guha, the then Head of the Department of Comparative Literature of Jadavpur University, attended the court on 18 November and gave witness for Prajapati and reaffirmed it was a work entirely free from obscenity. He also confirmed that this novel could by no means be harmful for the young.

The main charge was made against the passages where Shukhen describes Shikha's body features; also the event of a picnic where Jina meets Sukhen beside a sugarcane field was regarded as obscene and underlined in red by Amal Mitra. Two other episodes that were termed obscene were i) one between Sukhen and Manjari and the other ii) between Purnendu and the maidservant's daughter were also held to be obscene.
The final verdict of the Bankshal Court went against Samaresh Basu and Shitangsu Kumar Dasgupta. Prajapati was convicted as an obscene work.
Mr. Basu and Mr. Dasgupta were convicted under the Indian Penal Code No. 292. The author was sentenced to pay two hundred and one rupees for writing and publishing an obscene novel and the amount had to be paid within two months, failing which there would be a jail term.  Once the time was over to appeal against this verdict 174-226 pages of Sharadiyo Desh of 1374 had to be destroyed.

High Court trial
Both Samaresh Basu and Shitangsu Kumar Dasgupta and Amal Mitra and State Government of West Bengal appealed to the High Court of Kolkata. The writer urged to overturn the verdict of Bankshal Court whereas Amal Mitra appealed for enhancement of punishment. Both appeals went under Justice N. C. Talukdar's Court. Samaresh Basu had appealed on 17 February 1969, appeal number 106/1969 and Amal Mitra appealed on 12 March 1969 and the appeal number was 299/1969. Both the accuser and the accused tried to explain in the High Court trial their point of view. The verdict of the High Court was issued on 27 June 1972. The High Court upheld the verdict given by Bankshal Court. This time the novel Prajapati, published by Ananda Publishers came to be banned. Four years had passed since 1968 and Prajapati had gone onto the 8th edition. After that verdict of Kolkata High Court, one day some police raided Ananda Publishers Private Limited, 45, Beniatola Lane, College Street, the publisher of Prajapati with the intention of seizing the remaining copies of the novel.
The Managing director of APL and the chief executive of Anandabazar Partika decided to appeal to the Supreme Court. An application was sent to the Kolkata High Court seeking permission to attend Supreme Court according to the article number 134(1) of the constitution. But Justice Amaresh Ray tossed away the application.

The trial judge and high court regarded the convicted passages as obscene because of the descriptions of female body and frequent use of slang. The remarks made by Badhyadev Basu and Naresh Guha were treated notoriously by the trial judge of Kolkata High Court. He considered their judgement as oblivious and meaningless. He said that it was not the specialist but for the judiciary to judge whether something was obscene in writing or not. In the written copy of the verdict he mentions
Hicklin- 1
...whether the tendency of the matter charged as obscene is to deprave and corrupt those whose minds are open to such immoral influences and into whose hands a publication of this sort may fall.

Supreme Court trial
Samaresh Basu and the authority of Desh appealed to the Supreme Court of India on 9 July 1973 by Special Leave according to Penal code No: 136 of Indian Constitution. This appeal was fixed with Justice H.R. Khanna and Justice Algiri Swami on 24 August 1973. The Supreme Court accepted this appeal against the order of High Court of Kolkata. The Supreme Court appeal number was 174/1973 for Samaresh Basu and Shitangsu Kumar Dasgupta versus Amal Mitra and West Bengal Government.

On 24 September 1985, the final verdict of Supreme Court came out. It declared Prajapati as free from the charges of obscenity and all the complaints overturned from Samaresh Basu and Shitangsu Kumar Dasgupta. The court concluded: "On a very anxious consideration and after carefully applying our judicial mind in making an objective assessment of the novel, we do not think that it can be said with any assurance that the novel is obscene merely because slang and unconventional words have been used in the book in which there have been emphasis on sex and description of female bodies and there are the narrations of feelings, thoughts and actions in vulgar language". Finally it took 12 years and the verdict of the Supreme Court for the novel to be cleared of charges. Sagarmoy Ghosh, the working editor of Desh of that time noted this event as an historical landmark in Bengali literature. He said that there were some books that got banned and subsequently released from conviction from the local court. But he said that he did not know of any such event like Prajapati that had gone on to face conviction for seventeen years. The novel was published again.

Public response

All the trial had been accomplished with huge crowd in the court room. People responded fluently. The question of obscenity became an issue of discussion even outside the court. Several meetings were held at University of Calcutta. This debate extended elsewhere as well.

Main debate

Interpretations
This text had received various interpretations. Samaresh Basu said that the existence of Sukhen is a burning question in our society. He is a product of our society. He used first person narrative style so that he could portray Sukhen in a lively manner. We can identify with Sukhen through his speech and his process of thinking. Prajapati is a metaphor for Sukhen's life and beyond. It is a symbol of beauty. But it has been killed when it refused to get caught. In the end, we notice that Sukhen had lost one arm as had the butterfly at the beginning of the novel.

Amal Mitra's argument was that Prajapati has no literary value whatsoever. That only thing it could do was to corrupt the reader and cause moral degradation in them. In this novel he found Sukhen no more than ruffian. Another witness Kalaboron Ghosh said Prajapati was entirely obscene. There could be no reason except earning money as the possible reason behind writing this. No one can hand it over to his children or family member.

Budhadeb Basu supported this novel and substantiated the use of slang words and the description of female body as a need to add vivacity to the characters. He also argued the description of sexuality was universal in literature. Sukhen was a common human being. He did not fall in the category of the conventional 'vodrolok' but there are people like him. His love for Shikha was the nadir that was helped him to restore himself back in the mainstream of the society. To Budhadev Basu this novel placed a high moral lesson through its depiction of the psychology of Sukhen. This novel also discussed how the families of urban Bengal sometimes worked. It arouses consciousness in the mind of the readers and helped to recognise the society we live in.
Dr. Naresh Guha reported that Prajapati is a conscious criticism of society. No part of this novel could be charged with obscenity. He didn't think it would help any reader to become corrupted.

Law of obscenity
Both the Bankshal court and High Court accused Prajapati as obscene. The trial judges pronounced their verdict under section 292 of Indian Penal Code which maintains the Hicklin test. Several important propositions were raised on the law of obscenity in India while dealing with this case. What is obscenity? What are the determinants of obscenity in literature? ‘…legal concept used to characterize certain (particularly sexual) material as offensive to the public sense of decency. A wholly satisfactory definition of obscenity is elusive, however, largely because what is considered obscene is often, like beauty, in the eye of the beholder. Although the term originally referred to things considered repulsive, it has since acquired a more specifically sexual meaning.'4
The concept of obscenity is moulded to a very great extent by the social outlook of the people who are generally expected to read the book. The concept of obscenity usually differs from country to country depending on the standards of morality of contemporary society. In India, the principal statutory provision on the subject of obscene publication is to be found in section 292 of the Indian Penal Code stated above. Sub section (2) of it punishes a variety of acts concerning obscene publication and obscene objects. So far as the journalists are concerned, the material provisions are to be found in clauses (a) and (b) of the subsections. Though the amendment of 1969 brought about some changes it did not still lay down in its definition.
The conviction was made about using slang words in Prajapati that was unfamiliar with the literature of the time. Mr. P M Bakshi stated in his article "The Need for a New Convention"‘... the mere fact that the language used was vulgar would not be enough to render the book as obscene. Vulgar writing is not necessarily obscene. The essence of obscenity of a novel is the effect of depraving, debasing and corrupting the morals of the readers of the novel. Vulgarity may arouse disgust and revulsion but does not necessarily corrupt the morals of the reader.' Debate was raised about the disputable status of Hicklin test in present-day India. Generally speaking existing obscenity laws in countries like UK and USA are more liberal than their counterparts in India. Experts do feel the need for updated obscenity laws. Because of rapid transformation of society it's very hard and most of the time impossible to cope up these charges made against literature with the help of such outdated laws. Dealing with the charges of obscenity in literature in India one must look way back to 1860 in England. Though a century later Britain liberalized its obscenity laws the Indian laws are yet stuck to the moral standards prevalent in 19th-century Britain.
As there is no explanatory note for the term obscene, the interpretation of it may become highly subjective and therefore contentious. Sometimes the judiciary argues that they are concerned about 'popular permissiveness' as they regard themselves guardian of public morals. But who is to decide what the level of permissiveness in society? In Prajapat’si case both the Bankshal and lower court ironically took charges to decide its permissiveness in society. The Supreme Court adopted a different attitude though. It distinguished between vulgarity and obscenity and insisted that the only standard of a writer must not be to go by the fact that the adolescent might encounter sex in a particular literary work. Mr. Bakshi also noted in his article that a perceptive reader of judgment would notice Supreme Court's attention to balance between several inter conflicting factors which has a tendency to compete each other whenever the question of obscenity is raised. These factors are – the young and adolescent reader versus the total reading audience; literary merit of a book versus possible moral objections against its content; realism in literature which is the author's predominant consideration versus maintenance of the existing social order which is a requirement of the society; and finally, the creative urge of the writer which is essentially limitless, as contrasted with the various legal constraints through which the society tries its right to impose restraints on the creative activities which can cause harm.

An independent and enlightened judiciary is the best agency to resolve such controversies. The assessment of obscenity under legal terms is at the same time gray and vague as the term itself. The lack of space for a common understanding of what is immoral and what is not gives rise to other controversies that dwell under this umbrella term. There are innumerable instances throughout the history of censorship in literature which has dealt with other politics that back charges of obscenity.

Adaptation
In 1993 a Bengali film Prajapati was made by Biplab Chatterjee based on the story. Soumitra Chatterjee, Satabdi Roy, Robi Ghosh and Mamata Shankar acted in the film.

References

Sources
1. Appendix of 11th edition of Prajapati compiled by Bijit Kumar Basu.

2. 'Samaresh Bose and Another v Amal Mitra and Another',Obscenity under the law: A review of significant cases Compiled by Siddharth Narrain

3. Satinath Bhaduri Endowment Lecture/2, Amader Bastob O Samaresh Bosur Kathasilpa, Satyajit Chaudhury.

1967 novels
Indian Bengali-language novels
1967 Indian novels
20th-century Indian novels
Indian novels adapted into films
Novels set in one day